is Rimi Natsukawa's debut EP, released on , consisting of covers of Okinawan songs.

Background

The EP was released after three singles, but only her hit single "Nada Sōsō" features. The album consists of six covers and an original track (Natsukawa's full-length debut album Tida: Tida Kaji nu Umui, released six months later, also followed this pattern).

Song sources

Other than "Nada Sōsō," two other tracks are associated with the Okinawan band Begin who composed the track. "Irayoi Tsukiyohama" (a Yasukatsu Ōjima cover) had its music written by band vocalist Eishō Higa, and has been recorded by the band. "Hana," a Shoukichi Kina song, was recorded by the band on their "Nada Sōsō" single (released a year prior to Natsukawa's version).

"Warabigami" is a Misako Koja cover, "Ōgon no Hana" is a Nenes cover and "Tinsagu nu Hana" is a traditional Okinawan folk song.

Track listing

Japan sales rankings

References

Rimi Natsukawa albums
2002 EPs
Victor Entertainment EPs